Rothesay High School is a high school located in Rothesay, New Brunswick, Canada. It is part of Anglophone South School District.

History
Rothesay High School fills the educational needs for students in grades 9 through 12. The population of 517 students reside primarily in the town of Rothesay. The school offers instruction in both French Immersion and English.
The building itself is one story with a brick façade, located across the street from the former District 6 offices, and near both the Rothesay Arena and Harry Miller Middle School. It was constructed in 1951 and was called Rothesay Regional High School (RRHS), and served students in grades 7-12. In 1963 Rothesay Regional High School relocated in what is now Harry Miller Middle School and this building became Rothesay Junior High School. In 1991 the building was damaged by fire. It was subsequently renovated and expanded, reopening in September 1992 as the new Rothesay Junior High School. In 1997 the building was redesignated as a high school, graduating its first class in 2000.
Rothesay High's first principal was Richard Forrester, who retired in 1998, the school's inaugural year.  From 1998-2012, Roger Brown served as principal.

Athletic achievements
RHS has won a number of provincial banners in its short history, including championships in Basketball, Soccer, Golf and Cheerleading.  In golf, RHS won 4 straight banners from 2004 to 2007, withdrawing from competition in 2008 due to the provincial tournament being held during school hours.

External links 
 Rothesay High School Official Website

High schools in New Brunswick
Schools in Kings County, New Brunswick